Edward Wolfe (1685–1759) was a British Army officer.

Edward Wolfe may also refer to:

 Edward Wolfe (RAF officer) (1911–1994), Battle of Britain pilot
 Edward H. Wolfe (1834–1916), American Civil War brevet general
 Ed Wolfe (1929–2009), American baseball player
 Edward Wolfe (artist) (1897–1982), British artist

See also
Edward Wolff (disambiguation)